In mathematics, given a locally Lebesgue integrable function  on , a point  in the domain of  is a Lebesgue point if

References

Mathematical analysis